Antonio Vidal Fernández (born February 20, 1928, Havana, Cuba, died July 30, 2013) was a Cuban artist. He was active in the fields of painting, drawing, engraving, graphic design, and sculpture. Between 1953 and 1955 he was a member of the Grupo "Los Once", Havana. In 1962 he was a founding member of the Taller Experimental de Gráfica de La Habana (TEG), Havana.

Individual exhibitions
Solo exhibitions include Antonio Vidal: tintas in the Galería de La Habana, Havana, 1967. In 1991 he exhibited his works in a sahow titled Antonio Vidal. Pinturas in the Galería La Acacia, Havana. That same year he presented Antonio Vidal. Pinturas in the Galería Alfama, Zaragoza, Spain. In 1993 he displayed Antonio Vidal 40 años en la Plástica. Pinturas y Dibujos de pequeño Formato in the Galería de Arte Galiano y Concordia, Havana.

Collective exhibitions
He was part of many collective exhibitions, such as 1954's Contemporary Cuban Group in the Galería Sudamericana, New York City. In 1963 he was one of the selected artists to display at 1913-1963 Cincuentenario del Museo Nacional in the Museo Nacional de Bellas Artes, Havana. In 1966 he was part of the Ínternational Print Biennale at Cracow, Poland.In 1966 he was part of the Exhibition "Pittura Cubana Contemporanea" at Galleria Due Mondi in Rome, [Italy]. In the same year he also participated in the 5th International Print Biennial at the Museum of Modern Art, Tokyo, Japan. In 1984 he was included in the show Por la Libertad y la Amnistía total at the Centro Cultural del Conde Duque, Madrid, Spain. In 1997 he was one of the selected artists for Pinturas del Silencio at the Galería La Acacia, Havana.

Awards
In 1999 Fernández was recognized with the Award Premio Nacional de Artes Plásticas from the Ministry of Culture, Cuba.

Collections
In Cuba his works formed part of the collections of the Museo Nacional de Bellas Artes de La Habana.

References

 Vicente Baez, Virilio Pinera, Calvert Casey, and Anton Arrufat, Editors; Pintores Cubanos, Editors ; Ediciones Revolucion, Havana, Cuba 1962  
 Jose Veigas-Zamora, Cristina Vives Gutierrez, Adolfo V. Nodal, Valia Garzon, Dannys Montes de Oca; Memoria: Cuban Art of the 20th Century; (California/International Arts Foundation 2001); 
 Jose Viegas; Memoria: Artes Visuales Cubanas Del Siglo Xx; (California International Arts 2004);   
 Enrico Crispolti, Adelaida De Juan, "Pittura Cubana Contemporanea", catalogo della mostra, Galleria Due Mondi, Roma, 1966

Cuban contemporary artists
1928 births
2013 deaths